AS Ferjeselskapet Drøbak–Hurum–Svelvik is a Norwegian company that operates the car ferry from Svelvik to Verket. The service is the only crossing of the Drammen Fjord, and is provided half-hour services on their ferry with capacity for 20 cars. The company is based in Drøbak.

References 

Ferry companies of Viken
Shipping companies of Norway
Companies with year of establishment missing